Petrocephalus arnegardi is a species of electric fish in the genus Petrocephalus native to the Central Congo River basin. It is found in middle Congo River and in the Likouala River drainage, in the Democratic Republic of the Congo and Republic of the Congo. It is named after Matthew Arnegard, an expert on elephantfishes.

Description
Petrocephalus arnegardi grow to  SL. It is a silvery white fish with three distinct bilateral melanin marks: one slightly anterior to the dorsal fin, another one at the base of the pectoral fin, and one centered at the base of the caudal fin. Mouth is small and subterminal.

References

Mormyridae
Fish of the Democratic Republic of the Congo
Fish of the Republic of the Congo
Fish described in 2014